The 2018 Tour de France was the 105th edition of the race, one of cycling's Grand Tours. The 21-stage race takes place from 7 July to 29 July 2018. All eighteen Union Cycliste Internationale (UCI) WorldTeams were automatically invited and were obliged to attend the race. Four UCI Professional Continental teams were given wildcard places into the race by the organiser – Amaury Sport Organisation (ASO) – to complete the 22-team peloton. As each team was entitled to enter eight riders, the peloton on the first stage consisted of 176 riders from 30 countries.

Teams

Cyclists

By starting number

By team

By nationality 
The 176 riders that are competing in the 2018 Tour de France originated from 30 different countries.

References

External links
 

2018 Tour de France
2018